Balnafettack (: Farm of the Plovers) is an area in the north west of Inverness located in the Scottish Highlands.  It is named after the farm upon which the present residential housing is built.  It sits above Scorguie and was the final area on the West-side of Inverness to be developed due to its proximity to the steep crags of Craig Phadraig.  The Vitrified fort at the top of Craig Phadraig is accessed from Balnafettack.

Areas of Inverness